The Bronx Bull is a 2016 American biographical sports film written and directed by Martin Guigui and starring William Forsythe, Paul Sorvino, Joe Mantegna, Tom Sizemore, Natasha Henstridge, and Penelope Ann Miller. It is based on the story of the legendary boxing champion Jake LaMotta and it tells the struggles of the champion with the outside life. The film was filmed in Los Angeles and released in United States on January 6, 2017.

Plot 
A combination prequel and sequel  of the Raging Bull that explores "before the rage" and "after the rage" of world middleweight boxing champ Jake LaMotta's tumultuous life and times.

Cast

Lawsuit
In 2006, Variety reported that Sunset Pictures was developing a sequel to Raging Bull entitled Raging Bull II: Continuing the Story of Jake LaMotta, chronicling LaMotta's early life, as told in the sequel novel of the same name.  In July 2012, MGM, owners of United Artists, filed a lawsuit against LaMotta and the producers of Raging Bull II to keep the new film from being released. The former party argued that they have rights to make any authorized sequel to the original book, which goes back to an agreement LaMotta and co-author Peter Savage made with Chartoff-Winkler, producers of the original film. In addition, MGM argues that the defendants are publicly claiming the film to be a sequel to the original film, which could most likely "tarnish" its predecessor's reputation. In August 2012, the producers retitled the film The Bronx Bull, disassociating itself as a sequel to Raging Bull, and the lawsuit was subsequently dropped.

References

External links
 

American sports drama films
2016 films
Films shot in Los Angeles
American boxing films
2010s English-language films
2010s American films